Ruiselede (historically Ruysselede) is a municipality located in the Belgian province of West Flanders. This town only comprises the town of Ruiselede proper. On January 1, 2006, Ruiselede had a total population of 5,113. The total area is 30.20 km² which gives a population density of 169 inhabitants per km².

Ruiselede was the location of a coastal radio site. From 1923 to 1940 it had a VLF aerial. On 30 December 1933, the mast was demolished when an aircraft collided with it.

Gallery

References

External links 

Municipalities of West Flanders